Manjiang, also known as Manhua, is an Eastern Min dialect spoken mainly in Taishun and Cangnan Counties in Wenzhou, as well as parts of Qingyuan County in Lishui, in southeastern Zhejiang province.

As a dialect of Eastern Min, Manjiang is very distant from major Chinese varieties such as Mandarin and Cantonese, and displays very significant elements of a substratal indigenous language, perhaps belonging to the Austroasiatic or Tai–Kadai language families.

Notes

References

 

Eastern Min
Languages of China